Ateliers et Chantiers de Penhoët was a shipyard established in 1861 by the Scottish engineer John Scott in Saint-Nazaire, France. It was owned by the Compagnie Générale Transatlantique from its founding to 1900. The shipyard was managed by Scott until 1867 when management was transferred to Compagnie des Chantiers et Ateliers de l'Ocean and its successors until the yard temporarily closed in 1871 before reopening a decade later. In 1955 it was combined with Ateliers et Chantiers de la Loire to form Chantiers de l'Atlantique. It also had a shipyard in Grand-Quevilly, near Rouen, during the 1920s.

Bibliography

1861 establishments in France
Saint-Nazaire
Shipyards of France
1955 disestablishments in France